The United States Theater Event System (TES) is a missile-warning system.  The TES is composed of three ground elements: the Space Based Infrared System (SBIRS) Mission Control Station, the Joint Tactical Ground Station (JTAGS), and the Tactical Detection and Reporting system. The TES in-theater capability will be enhanced significantly as its hardware and software are upgraded to interface with the future SBIRS High and Space Tracking and Surveillance System satellite constellations.

See also
Joint Tactical Ground Station (JTAGS)
Defense Support Program (DSP)
Space Based Infrared System (SBIRS)

References

Military equipment
Missile defense